Dov (Dubi) Lupi (born August 24, 1948) is a retired Israeli-American Olympic gymnast who competed as well for Washington State University. He competed for Israel in the 1976 Summer Olympics in Montreal, Quebec, Canada, where he ranked 68th in the individual all-around competition with a score of 106.45 points, and 38th in parallel bars.

He also competed for Team Israel at the 1977 Maccabiah Games, where he had the best overall standing, with a gold medal in the horse and with several silver medals.

He was born and raised on Kibbutz Sarid in Israel.

References

External links
 

1948 births
Living people
Competitors at the 1977 Maccabiah Games
Jewish gymnasts
Maccabiah Games medalists in gymnastics
Maccabiah Games gold medalists for Israel
Maccabiah Games bronze medalists for Israel
Israeli male artistic gymnasts
Olympic gymnasts of Israel
Gymnasts at the 1976 Summer Olympics